The 2016 Mexican League season was the 92nd season in the history of the Mexican League. It was contested by 16 teams, evenly divided in North and South zones. The season started on 1 April with the series between Tigres de Quintana Roo and Leones de Yucatán and ended on 14 September with the last game of the Serie del Rey, where Pericos de Puebla defeated Toros de Tijuana to win the championship.

Standings

Postseason

First round

Championship Series

Serie del Rey

League leaders

Awards

References

Mexican League season
Mexican League season
Mexican League seasons